The Strachan Challenge Series – Event 1 was a professional minor-ranking snooker tournament, that was held from 12 to 21 December 1992 at the Jimmy White Snooker Lodge in Aldershot, England.

The event was held in an effort to encourage some of the hundreds of new professionals who had joined the tour, the WPBSA experimented with several so-called minor ranking events. These were open to all the pros but carried a much lower ranking points tariff, around ten per cent of that applicable to most of the other tournaments. The already established Benson and Hedges Championship was one of the four events and the others were three legs of the Strachan Challenge. Although there was no restriction as to who could enter, most of the top 16 did not bother. They were played out at snooker clubs, the first and the third at Aldershot and the second in Sheffield. The experiment was not repeated although there were two further Challenge events the following season which did not carry any ranking status.
 
Joe Swail won the tournament by defeating Stefan Mazrocis nine frames to four in the final.


Main draw

References

1992 in snooker